There were two budgets held in the United Kingdom in 2015:

March 2015 United Kingdom budget
July 2015 United Kingdom budget